Kim Hyung-soo (Korean: 김형수) (born December 22, 1990), better known as Brother Su (Korean: 브라더수), is a South Korean singer-songwriter and record producer. Su debuted in 2010 and has been signed under Starship Entertainment's subsidiary label Starship X since 2015.

Career

2010–2015: Early work and RealCollabo 
Prior to his debut, Brother Su participated in "Christmas Card from Real Collabo" with his remix of "Winter Wonderland". The next year he officially debuted as RealCollabo's first singer with single "It was You". In the same year, he released another single "You Got Me".

The following years, Brother Su started featuring and writing for his label mates as well as other artists. Started with featuring in Mad Clown's "Basil", he was also featured in Andup's "Like This Right Now", Giriboy's "Player", Cheeze's "Papapa", d.ear's "We Need to Talk", Kebee's "Travel Bag", and Swings's "Two Thumbs". He produced label mate Siaena's "Sound of Rain" and Lovey's "Return", as well as Crucial Star's "Flat Shoes". In his early years as a lyricist, Brother Su teamed up with Ra.D for Jooyoung's "All of You" and "Hang Up the Phone", and Ra.D's "Thank You, Thank You".

On July 4, 2013 he released his first full album Paper, containing ten self-composed songs.

In 2015, Brother Su established his name as songwriter. His composed song, "I Need U" by BTS won first place in music programs. This success was followed with "Eat" by Zion.T, which did very well in South Korean digital music charts.

In the same year, he released his first mini album 사이 (Space) with six self-composed songs. "Space" was Brother Su's last release under RealCollabo. RealCollabo closed in October 2015.

2015–present: Starship Entertainment 
On October 7, Starship Entertainment announced Brother Su has joined the company. A few days later, he released his first soundtrack, "You Don't Know Me" for MBC drama, She Was Pretty. This duet song with Soyou of Sistar was the song that introduced Brother Su to broader public.

Together with Jooyoung, Brother Su took part on collaboration with his old label mates Ra.D and d.ear, releasing "Draw You". It is a remake of d.ear's old song which is also the last release of RealCollabo. He was featured in San E & Mad Clown's "Lonely Animals" released in November 2015. Starship Planet's 2015 winter song "Softly" was his first participation in the company's family song.

In February 2016, Brother Su along with K.Will, Junggigo, and Jooyoung released a special Valentine's song, "Cook for Love". A few days later, he released a duet song with Mad Clown, "Like Romance Comics".

Personal life 
He has a younger sister, Lovey, who is also a singer-songwriter.

Discography

Studio albums

Extended plays

Singles

Soundtrack appearances

Production credits

References

External links 
 Brother Su's Instagram
 Brother Su's Twitter

Starship Entertainment artists
Starship X artists
1990 births
Living people
South Korean contemporary R&B singers
South Korean record producers
21st-century South Korean male  singers
South Korean male singer-songwriters